Sântimbru is a commune located in Alba County, Transylvania, Romania. It has a population of 2,740, and is composed of five villages: Coșlariu (Koslárd), Dumitra (Demeterpataka), Galtiu (Gáldtő), Sântimbru and Totoi (Táté).

Following the Mongol invasion of Europe, Transylvanian Saxons settled in Sântimbru in the 13th century. Driven out by Ottomans in the 16th century, they were replaced by Hungarians, who practised woodcutting. Ethnic Romanians have been in the majority since the 19th century, and today, the inhabitants mainly build bricks and raise poultry.

The village of Totoi has developed a speech form known as Totoiana which consists in the inversion of Romanian words so that other speakers of normal Romanian cannot understand it. It is unique to the village, and it is not spoken in other parts of Sântimbru.

Points of interest
The commune has a Hungarian Reformed church founded by John Hunyadi in 1449.

Natives
 Samoilă Mârza

References

Communes in Alba County
Localities in Transylvania